Sat Deul is a 10th-11th century temple at Deule / Sat Deule in the Memari I CD block in the Bardhaman Sadar South subdivision of the Purba Bardhaman district in the Indian state of West Bengal.

Location

Sat Deul is located at 

Sat Deul is located east of the Durgapur Expressway (part of National Highway 19) and is approachable via the Memari-Tarakeswar Road. It is 3.5 km from Chanchai railway station on the Howrah-Bardhaman chord line. "The complex is complete with manicured lawns, flower beds and paved pathways."

Rekha deul
David J. McCutchion says that the predominant traditional architectural style for temples in the western areas of Bengal in the pre-Muslim period is the tall curvilinear rekha deul and it went on developing from the late 7th century or early 8th century to around the 12th century, increasing its complexity and height but retaining its basic features. Such temples had "curvilinear  with  mesh decoration, surmounted by a large  and  finial. Examples of such dilapidated  are still standing at Satdeula (in Bardhaman), Bahulara and Sonatapal (in Bankura) and Deulghat (in Purulia).  On the brick  already mentioned here, plus Jatar (in 24 Parganas) and Para (in Purulia), "we find extensive and remarkably fine stucco work on carved brick".

Highlights  
This brick-built temple shows the features of the Nagara style. The ground plan is pancha -ratha, surmounted by a curvilinear tower. The temple has stucco works over carved bricks. Jaina sculptures found at the place  may indicate that it belonged to the Jaina faith and the temple is datable to c. 10th-11 th century AD. P.C.Dasgupta, in the Jain Journal 7/3: 130- 132, 1973, mentions Sat deuliya as a rare Jain icon. In the List of Monuments of National Importance in West Bengal it is mentioned as a Jain brick temple.

Sat Deul picture gallery

References

Jain temples in West Bengal
Monuments of National Importance in West Bengal
Tourist attractions in Purba Bardhaman district